"Mr. Arrow Key" is a song by German recording artist Lena Meyer-Landrut. It was written by Lena Meyer-Landrut, Linda "Miss Li" Carlsson and Sonny Boy Gustafsson for her third studio album Stardust (2012), while production was helmed by the latter. The song was released as the album's third and final single and reached the top fifty of the German Singles Chart.

Background
"Mr. Arrow Key" was written by Meyer-Landrut in collaboration with the Swedish singer-songwriter Linda Carlsson, who is also known as Miss Li in Sweden, and Sonny Boy Gustafsson, who also produced the track for Lena. Lisa Carlsson also featured with Lena on other song called ASAP. Gustafsson and Carlsson were involved at several songs on Lena's album Stardust, in total there are five songs that were either co-written by both musicians and/or produced.

Mr. Arrow Key was recorded in Sweden, Gröhndal Årstaberg studio. It is 3 minutes and 33 seconds long and was first published on 12 October 2012 on Lena's third album Stardust, as the second track on the track list. Technically, the song genre is described as pop song with folk and swing influences.

Lyrically, the song is about conflict in life, and the desire to find something or someone who would set a clear direction. Arrow Key means an arrow button, but in song metaphorically this means one direction: "Been climbing up/the walls but I am falling down/I’ve been running through the streets/But I still haven’t found/I’m looking for, I’m searching for it desperately/But I can’t find the arrow key."

On April 18, it was announced, that Mr. Arrow Key will be Lena's seventh single and third single from her album via her own and official website. In early May, Mr. Arrow Key, as single, was put on Amazon.

The first television presenting was on breakfast television at the broadcasting station Sat.1 on 12 October 2012. Back in September, 2012, Lena performed this song for the first time in festival, Reeperbahn Festival 2012, with some other songs from her album. Meyer-Landrut also performed the song several times on her latest tour, No One Can Catch Us. On May 10, 2013, she performed it on The Voice Kids final. The performance consisted of Lena either sitting or standing on black platform and her dancing on the stage in front of audience.

In an interview with Universal, Lena talked about this song:

Critical reception
Critical reception of "Mr. Arrow Key" was generally mixed. Birgit Fuss from Rolling Stone described the song as "irresistible catchy" and compared Meyer-Landrut's vocals with singer Amy Macdonald. Münchner Merkur writer Jörg Heinrich called the song a "speedy folk-country-cracker". He also cited comparisons with Macdonald. Kevin Holtmann from Plattentests.de declared "Mr. Arrow Key" a well-crafted "meaningless nonsense sixties with polkadots sauce."

Kai Butterweck, writing from Laut.de, wrote: "Lena gathered a thunderous swing horde around him. Childishly happy as ever she tries to squeeze a large part of their English vocabulary in three and a half minutes. By the end of the chorus, the original tempo is actually good, but not quite follow, and then the trained habits of overseas accent in many places sounds put something."

Music video
The music video was first released on 14 May 2013. It combines several scenes from Meyer-Landrut's No One Can Catch Us Tour to 13 German cities, in particular from her gig in Offenbach am Main.

Track listing

Credits and personnel 

 Writers: Lena Meyer-Landrut, Sonny Boy Gustafsson, Linda Carlsson
 Producer: Sonny Boy Gustafsson
 Lead vocal: Lena Meyer-Landrut
 Background vocals: Sonny Boy Gustafsson, Linda Carlsson
 Bass: Clas Lassbo
 Drums: Gustav Nahlin

 Guitars, synthesizers, percussion: Sonny Boy Gustafsson
 Trumpet: Johan Jonsson
 Tenor saxophone: Linus Lindblom
 Trombone: Magnus Wiklund
 Mixing: Black Pete
 Mastering: Greg Calbi

Charts

Weekly charts

References

External links
 

2013 singles
Lena Meyer-Landrut songs
2012 songs
Universal Music Group singles
Songs written by Lena Meyer-Landrut